The 1957–58 SM-sarja season was the 27th season of the SM-sarja, the top level of ice hockey in Finland. 10 teams participated in the league, and Ilves Tampere won the championship.

Regular season

Group A

Group B

3rd place 
 Tarmo Hämeenlinna - TPS Turku 3:3/4:1

Final
 Ilves Tampere - Tappara Tampere 2:1 (4:6, 7:1, 3:1)

External links
 Season on hockeyarchives.info

Fin
Liiga seasons
1957–58 in Finnish ice hockey